Carnival Magic is a 1983 American film directed by Al Adamson and starring Don Stewart.

Marketed as a family-oriented children’s film, it has since gained a cult following in underground and B movie film circles owing to its surreal plot and incongruously-adult themes.

Plot
Markov the Magnificent is a talented magician and mind-reader whose career is fading.  When he partners with a super-intelligent talking chimp named Alexander the Great, the duo suddenly become a big draw—and the potential savior for their struggling, small-time traveling circus. Markov and fellow workers inside the circus must fend off a jealous, alcoholic tiger-tamer and an evil doctor intent on stealing the chimp.

Cast
 Don Stewart as Markov
 Regina Carrol as Kate
 Jennifer Houlton as Ellen
 Howard Segal as David
 Joe Cirillo as Kirk
 Mark Weston as Stoney
 Charles Reynolds as Dr. Poole
 Missy O'Shea as Girl in Car

Background
Principal photography took place for the film over the span of three weeks in July 1980 in Gaffney, South Carolina, during that city's South Carolina Peach Festival. Many of the scenes in Gaffney were shot at the peach festival's carnival, its parade, and in a second parade staged for the movie. Additional work for the film was done at the Earl Owensby Studios in Shelby, North Carolina.

Producer Elvin Feltner and director Al Adamson intended the film as family fare, aimed at children, and it was in fact given a G rating by the MPAA. However, the prevalence of adult themes (alcoholism, sex, abuse, violence) left many viewers confused. The film premiered at the Crosscreek Cinemas in Greenwood, South Carolina, on March 4, 1983, and was also shown in other theatres in the region beginning on that date. By November it had seen a wider release, and was (for example) being shown in New York City.

This was the last acting role for Regina Carrol, who was married to director Adamson and featured in several of his films. Philip Morris, a real-life ringmaster, magician, and costume maker, appears as a carnival barker. This was also one of Adamson’s last two films before retiring from the film industry and pursuing a career in real estate.

Revival and re-release
For two decades Carnival Magic was considered a lost film, and no prints were known to exist. This changed in 2009, when a 35mm print was discovered in a warehouse, sparking a revival of interest among cult film aficionados. Following the discovery of this print, Carnival Magic was restored and re-mastered in 2010, receiving its television debut on Turner Classic Movies in October of that year, as part of their TCM Underground series.  It saw a DVD release in early 2011 from Film Chest and HD Cinema Classics, reissued on Blu-ray and containing bonus material. The bonus material includes out-takes, trailers, audio commentary and interviews with cult film historian Joe Rubin and producer Elvin Feltner.

The film was featured in an episode of Mystery Science Theater 3000 as a part of the show's eleventh season, released on April 14, 2017 through Netflix.

References

External links
 
 
 Carnival Magic overview at Turner Classic Movies
 Carnival Magic on Amazon

American children's films
1980s exploitation films
American independent films
1983 independent films
1983 films
1980s children's fantasy films
Films shot in South Carolina
1980s rediscovered films
1980s English-language films
Films directed by Al Adamson
1980s American films